The Jewish Morning Journal was a Yiddish-language publication in New York from 1901 to 1971.

Early years
A politically conservative, Orthodox Jewish publisher, Jacob Saphirstein, founded the Jewish Morning Journal in 1901. It was published in Yiddish, the language of the majority of eastern European Jewish immigrants who settled on the Lower East Side of New York. The paper took on a more liberal slant in 1916, when Jacob Fishman became editor, replacing Peter (Peretz) Wiernik. After resigning as editor in 1938, Fishman continued his daily column, "From Day to Day."

Zionist in outlook, the Jewish Morning Journal advocated an Orthodox lifestyle, and was not published on Saturday, the Jewish Sabbath. It was a staunch advocate of the Americanization of the Eastern European immigrants who formed the bulk of its readership. Along with other Yiddish publications, its circulation declined steadily after World War I, as immigrants became more assimilated and used English.

Later years
In 1928 the Jewish Morning Journal merged with the Yidishes Tagblat (Yiddish יידישעס טאגעבלאט). Morris Cohen, a Canadian philanthropist, bought the Jewish Morning Journal in 1949. In 1953 the combined entity merged with the liberal Yiddish daily Jewish Day (Der Tog). In 1970 the circulation of The Day-Morning Journal was 50,000. The paper ceased publication in 1971.

Noted journalists

Gershom Bader
Bernard Gorin
Alexander Mukdoni
Jacob Glatstein
Gedaliah Bublick
Frank Taffel, Atlanta correspondent
Philip Krantz
Jacob Magidoff
Ḥayyim Malitz
Joseph Margoshes
M. Sharkansky
M. Seifert
Abner Tannenbaum
I. Friedman
Peter Wiernik
Michael Brown (New York, journalist 1927-1937 and city editor from 1937 to 1947)
M.J. Nurenberger (correspondent who became editor in 1947)
S. B. Komaiko

References

External links
Jewish Morning Journal at Historical Jewish Press

Newspapers established in 1901
Jewish newspapers published in the United States
Jewish-American history
Defunct Yiddish-language newspapers published in the United States
Jews and Judaism in New York City
Defunct newspapers published in New York City
Orthodox Judaism in New York City
Publications disestablished in 1971
Zionism in the United States
Non-English-language newspapers published in New York (state)
Daily newspapers published in New York City